"Staying Power" is the first track on Queen's 1982 album Hot Space. It was written by lead singer Freddie Mercury and is notable as being the only Queen song to have a horn section, which was arranged by Arif Mardin. The song is driven by a funk-styled bass riff (played by Mercury) beginning in D minor and modulating to E minor throughout the song. John Deacon does not play bass guitar on this song—instead playing rhythm guitar on a Fender Telecaster. Roger Taylor programmed a Linn LM-1 drum machine for the track. Brian May is on his Red Special. In a Stylus review of the album, critic Anthony Miccio described the song's style as "an electro-disco track with frenetic horns."

The song was released as a single in Japan.

Live performances
This song was played throughout the Hot Space Tour and to an extent, on The Works Tour. The live version of "Staying Power" is slightly different from the album version. Morgan Fisher took over the keyboard parts and replaced the Oberheim with a Roland Jupiter 8. Taylor replaced the drum machine with acoustic and electric drums. Also of note is that it was the only song played live in which Deacon played rhythm guitar, as the bass was performed via keyboard. With the electronics scaled back on the live version, the song is transformed into a funk rock song—rather than a disco-influenced rock song that stays strong to its disco influences. The live version is on Queen on Fire: Live at the Bowl, Queen Greatest Video Hits 2 and on the Hot Space 2011 deluxe CD album.

Personnel
Queen
Freddie Mercury – lead and backing vocals, synthesiser, synth bass
Brian May – electric guitar
Roger Taylor – electronic drums, drum machine
John Deacon – electric guitar

Additional 
Arif Mardin – "Hot and spacey" horn arrangement

References

External links
 
 Lyrics at Queen official website

Queen (band) songs
1982 singles
Songs written by Freddie Mercury
Song recordings produced by Reinhold Mack
EMI Records singles
Elektra Records singles
Hollywood Records singles
Funk rock songs
Disco songs